Swimming at the 2010 Central American and Caribbean Games was taking place July 18–23 (Days 2–7) at the RUM Natatorium in Mayagüez, Puerto Rico.

Schedule
The swimming competition featured a prelim/final format, with Prelims beginning at 9:00 a.m. and Finals at 6:00 p.m. Finals event schedule is:

Participating countries
207 total swimmers from 24 countries participated at the 2010 Games. Team delegates (with size) were from:

 (6)
 (11)
 (8)
 (6)
 (6)
 (14)
 (8)
 (10)
 (5)
 (3)
 (5)
 (1)
 (7)
 (11)
 (26)
 (3)
 (1)
 (3)
 (25)
 (4)
 (4)
 (10)
 (23)
 Virgin Islands (7)

Results

Men

Women

Medal table

References

External links

Events at the 2010 Central American and Caribbean Games
2010 in swimming